is a fictional group of characters featured in Square Enix and Disney Interactive Studios' Kingdom Hearts video game series. The group comprises thirteen beings including Xemnas and his twelve followers.

The concept of the Organization was originally introduced in Kingdom Hearts Final Mix within a bonus ending titled "Another Side, Another Story [deep dive]", where their Japanese name was translated as the "Thirteenth Order". The group was later introduced as the "Organization" in the game Kingdom Hearts: Chain of Memories, where they serve as the main antagonists, and returns in the same role in Kingdom Hearts II. Organization XIII is prominently featured in Kingdom Hearts 358/2 Days as characters available for play, along with a new female member named Xion. Several members, prior to becoming Nobodies, appear in Kingdom Hearts Birth by Sleep, return following their restoration in Kingdom Hearts 3D: Dream Drop Distance, and have returned in Kingdom Hearts III.

The group was moderately well received by reviewers. Comments focused on their difficulty as adversaries and mysterious nature, which fueled expectations of future titles. Roxas specifically received press comments, focusing on his introduction in Kingdom Hearts II.

Concept and creation
The Organization XIII characters were created by Tetsuya Nomura, director of the series, and other members of his development staff. The concept began with Xemnas as the first member and Roxas as the last. Each of the original members' name is an anagram of their original name prior to becoming a Nobody, with the addition of the letter "X" which is revealed in Kingdom Hearts Birth by Sleep to be derived from the χ-blade. The members are depicted to wear black, hooded coats that shield them from the corrosive effect of prolonged use of the Corridors of Darkness, portals they use to traverse various worlds. The emblem associated with the Nobodies and Organization XIII was designed to look like a splintered heart as a complement to the Heartless emblem. Nomura tried to portray the characters ambiguously, rather than explicitly good or evil. Throughout the games' development, Nomura has often left certain plot holes and relations regarding Organization XIII characters—along with the series' other characters—unexplained until the release of a sequel; feeling that games should give fans room to speculate and use their imagination.

In Chain of Memories, the staff had several of the Organization's members defeated as part of the plot. While Nomura intended to have those members be fought at Olympus Coliseum in the Kingdom Hearts II, he dropped the idea due to time constraints and later applied it to Kingdom Hearts II Final Mix and remakes in the form of optional "Absent Silhouette" boss fights where the player fights defeated Organization members. Since the battles were optional, the difficulty levels of the fights was increased and the Chain of Memories-exclusive characters were given previously unseen powers. After working with the first game, Nomura gained interest in including the Mushroom XIII Heartless, most of which served to yield rare items in the game. This interest continued during the development of Kingdom Hearts II, as he intended to add new variants of "Mushroom" Heartless in the game. Consequently, they are featured in the Final Mix release as the "Mushroom XIII", thirteen Heartless wearing the same black cloaks that also mimic traits of the Organization XIII members. For 358/2 Days, the developers believed the Organization and its large number of characters was a good fit for the intended multiplayer gameplay. Once the group was decided to be a central part of the gameplay, the staff felt Roxas's role as a member would be a suitable theme for the plot.

Several former members appear in Kingdom Hearts 3D: Dream Drop Distance, having regained their hearts following the destruction of their Heartless and Nobodies. In both the game and Kingdom Hearts III, revealed to be its true leader, Master Xehanort proceeds to create Organization XIII as it was meant to be: The Thirteen Seekers of Darkness with Xigbar and Saïx. Enlisting under false pretenses to reconstruct Roxas to fight them, Vexen uses the Replica technology to create vessels for Xehanort's time displaced incarnations while the recreated Demyx, Luxord, Marluxia, Larxene, Vanitas, and Xion are made into thralls like Saïx.

Members

Revealed to be one of the scenarios Master Xehanort devised, the Organization was established when Terra-Xehanort turned himself, his supporter Braig, and the disciples of Ansem the Wise into Nobodies with Terra-Xehanort's Nobody Xemnas as the group's leader. Originally numbered at eight, the Organization recruited a quartet of Nobodies, who were hand-picked by Xehanort as their original selves were time-displaced Keyblade users from the aftermath of the Keyblade War, before recruiting Roxas as their final member with Xion as an unofficial member. Each member is given a cloak made of a special material that allows them to pass through the Corridors of Darkness into other worlds safely without being attacked by the Heartless there. Members are given titles indicating both their role in Organization XIII and their personality, as well as their own breed of lesser Nobodies to control, usually suited to their fighting style and unique themed powers. As Nobodies, they lack emotion and morality, and are unable to feel guilt and remorse for their actions. However, most of the members' personalities are based from what memories they have of their original selves. Six of the Organization's members were introduced in Kingdom Hearts: Chain of Memories, with the remaining members introduced in Kingdom Hearts II. In Chain of Memories, the series' protagonist Sora and his friends Donald Duck and Goofy are led to a mysterious fortress called Castle Oblivion by Marluxia, who intends to turn Sora into his pawn by manipulating his memories. Sora's friend Riku also arrives at Castle Oblivion, but in the basement where he encounters other Organization members. Sora and Riku traverse the levels of the castle to reach the top, fighting and defeating several members along the way. By Kingdom Hearts II, the actions of Sora and Riku, along with Roxas' resignation, reduce the Organization to seven members, who seek to use the power of Kingdom Hearts—a repository of knowledge and power, and the source of all hearts—to become complete beings.

The events of the game Kingdom Hearts 3D: Dream Drop Distance reveal that the true purpose of Organization XIII is for Master Xehanort—the true incarnation of Xemnas' human form—to divide his heart among the bodies of its other members, effectively transforming them into clones of Xehanort so he may recreate the χ-blade using their thirteen hearts of darkness and seven hearts of light. It is also revealed that Nobodies such as those in the Organization are capable of developing hearts of their own over time, but are deceived by Xemnas into thinking they lack hearts so they can cooperate with his plans. Though this agenda is not realized for various reasons, a new Organization XIII is formed from various incarnations of Xehanort from across time, including Xemnas, "Ansem", and members who succeeded in becoming "half Xehanort". This gathering is accomplished by a younger version of Xehanort that is granted the power of time travel by his future self, though they have a final member to recruit as they attempted to make Sora their thirteenth member. The final members of the Real Organisation XIII were: Master Xehanort, Ansem, Xemnas, Xigbar, Luxord, Larxene, Marluxia, Saïx, Terra-Xehanort (Xehanort-possesed Terra), Dark Riku (an alternate version of Riku Replica), Vanitas, Young Xehanort and Xion (who served as a replacement for Sora).

Xemnas

First appearing in Kingdom Hearts Final Mix as an optional boss labeled , he is identified as the Nobody of Terra-Xehanort, originally Terra who became a host for Xehanort's heart, while his name is derived from Xehanort's alias "Ansem". He uses the power of nothingness to phase through solid matter and wield a pair of "ethereal blades", two red beams of light generated from his palms. He also commands the "Sorcerer" Nobodies.

Xemnas serves as the main antagonist of Kingdom Hearts II, where he gathers the hearts released by Roxas's Keyblade to cultivate his own version of Kingdom Hearts in the World That Never Was. When Roxas defects from the Organization and surrenders his existence to Sora, Xemnas manipulates Sora into completing the task instead. Kingdom Hearts II Final Mix features additional cutscenes that highlight Xemnas's other agendas which, according to Nomura, are influenced by Terra's memories. These include his secret conversations with Aqua's discarded armor preserved in the self-built "Chamber of Repose" in Hollow Bastion, as well as his search for the "Chamber of Waking", a secret room hidden within Castle Oblivion that houses Ventus' comatose body. His plans are thwarted when Ansem the Wise damages Kingdom Hearts and releases the accumulated hearts in his attempt to encode them within a machine. When Sora's party refuses to aid in its restoration, Xemnas uses what is left of Kingdom Hearts' power to assume multiple forms, eventually separating Sora and Riku from their allies. The two defeat him and Xemnas fades into nothingness.

The secret ending of Kingdom Hearts Re:coded reveals that Xemnas's destruction alongside his Heartless counterpart has resulted in Xehanort's restoration to human form. Xemnas also returns as one of the primary antagonists of Kingdom Hearts 3D: Dream Drop Distance, brought from the past by Young Xehanort to serve on the new Organization XIII. He reveals the true nature of the Organization to Sora before taking him in an attempt to convert him into the group's final member. Xemnas is ultimately defeated in Kingdom Hearts III, where he reveals feeling loneliness and regret over manipulating his former comrades while expressing some respect for Sora for being strong enough to move past sorrow.

Xigbar
Braig/Xigbar:

Luxu:

He also commands the "Sniper" Nobodies, and manipulates space to teleport himself, levitate, and alter his surroundings in battle. He is Xemnas's second-in-command, and is privy to Xemnas's various private agendas due to eavesdropping. At various points across the series, Xigbar taunts Sora by commenting on his angry glare, saying that "he used to give me that same exact look"; Sora's expression reminds him of Ventus whom Roxas bears a resemblance to. He would be revealed to be the ancient Keyblade Master .

Making his first chronological appearance in Kingdom Hearts χ, Luxu is the sixth apprentice of the Master of Masters who acted on his mentor's final request to observe the Keyblade War and protect the Black Box while passing the "No Name" Keyblade across the generations to the one who would bring about a second war. Luxu fulfilled observing the Keyblade War by influencing discontent among the Foretellers, with Ava's attempted attack on him over their master's Lost Page commencing the event. From there, Luxu used a technique to transfer his heart into another body to prolong his life to see "No Name" reaches its destined user. He eventually assumes the identity of Braig and finds Xehanort during the events of Birth by Sleep, feigning ignorance to be the Keyblade Master's right hand. Braig aids in Xehanort's plan to provoke Terra into unleashing inner darkness, resulting in his face being scarred, his right eye being damaged, and being infused with part of Xehanort's heart before dueling Aqua in the Keyblade Graveyard while observing Ventus's glare for the first time. Braig proceeds to oversee the next phase of Xehanort's plan while monitoring the apparent amnesic Terra-Xehanort who later attacked and turned him into Xigbar.

In 358/2 Days, Xigbar discovers Xion's true nature as a Replica before the other members, mocking Roxas with this knowledge. Throughout Kingdom Hearts II, Xigbar confuses Sora by making cryptic allusions to Roxas and the previous Keyblade wielders. During their battle at the World That Never Was, he mystifies Sora one last time by calling him Roxas, refusing to explain himself when he is defeated and fades away. Xigbar's destruction restores Braig to human form by the events of Dream Drop Distance, where he reappears in his Nobody identity as one of Xehanort's chosen "seekers of darkness", revealing himself to be a willing vessel for Xehanort's heart which has gradually transformed him into "half Xehanort". Following Xehanort's defeat in Kingdom Hearts III, Luxu discards his cover while reclaiming the "No Name" Keyblade to proceed with the next phase of his master's request by first summoning four of the five Foretellers to the present.

The telescopic sight sequence of Xigbar's boss battle underwent some content edits in the English release of Kingdom Hearts II. Before the sequence, Xigbar combines his two guns into a sniper rifle in the Japanese release, which was changed to him twirling his weapons and shooting with a single gun. The original animation was restored in the English release of Kingdom Hearts HD 2.5 Remix. The reticle was also changed from a crosshair within a circular scope to three glowing circles.

Xaldin

 is the Nobody of Ansem's guardsman , introduced in Kingdom Hearts II as the original Organization's number three. He commands the lance-wielding "Dragoon" Nobodies. Becoming a Nobody to be free of emotion, Xaldin understands the setbacks of lacking a heart, but keeps a clear disdain towards people who follow their hearts, developing a particular obsession towards the Beast from Beauty and the Beast. Xaldin primarily appears at the Beast's Castle in Kingdom Hearts II and 358/2 Days, where he attempts to manipulate the Beast's rage to create a powerful Nobody and Heartless for the Organization. He later steals the Beast's enchanted rose and kidnaps Belle to stoke the Beast's rage, but his plans fail when Belle escapes with the rose. Xaldin is vanquished by Sora, which results in his restoration as Dilan in Dream Drop Distance, reportedly still unstable alongside the revived Even. In Kingdom Hearts III, Dilan returns to his original post as guardsman.

Vexen

, originally named , is a mad scientist and researcher of the heart. As revealed in 358/2 Days, Vexen oversees the Organization's "Replica Program", which deals with the production of artificial human replicas such as Xion. In Chain of Memories, Vexen occupies the basement of Castle Oblivion with Lexaeus and Zexion, whom he sides with to prevent Marluxia's plan to overthrow the Organization. He battles Riku in order to gather data to create a replica of him, and allows Naminé to manipulate the replica's memories to test Sora's worth. Later, Vexen fights Sora himself with the intention of revealing Marluxia's plan to him. As a result, Marluxia declares Vexen a traitor and sends Axel to kill him, which Axel does to gain Marluxia's trust and prevent him from using Vexen's replica research. Despite Vexen's demise resulting in Even being restored in Dream Drop Distance, Even is made into a member of Xehanort's Organization by the events of Kingdom Hearts III, revealed to have rejoined to regain access to the Replica Program and redeem himself by providing Xion, Roxas, and Naminé with new bodies to exist in.

Lexaeus

His weapon is an "axe sword", a massive battle axe with an extended blade that he uses to shatter rocks and shake the area itself with his elemental power of earth. In the "Reverse/Rebirth" story mode of Chain of Memories, Lexaeus and Zexion seek to counter Marluxia's plans to overthrow the Organization with Sora by using Riku in the same fashion. When they believe that Sora might fall into Marluxia's grasp, Lexaeus confronts Riku directly, trying to convince him to open himself up to the power of the darkness in his heart. After Riku defeats him in the original Chain of Memories, the mortally wounded Lexaeus releases all of the darkness within himself to consume Riku. In Re:Chain of Memories, Lexaeus is instead killed when Xehanort's Heartless possesses Riku to personally finish Lexaeus off. Lexaeus's demise leads to his revival as Aeleus in Dream Drop Distance, informing Lea that Dilan and Even are resting due to still being unstable, and that Braig and Xehanort are still missing. In Kingdom Hearts III, Aeleus returns to his original post as guardsman.

Zexion

Zexion does not use a weapon in his original appearance in Chain of Memories, with the game's remake revealing his weapon to be a lexicon. Appearing in "Reverse/Rebirth", Zexion initially plans to use Riku against Marluxia and his co-conspirators. After Sora defeats Marluxia, Zexion attempts to dispose of Riku by drawing him into a simulation of the Destiny Islands, where Zexion attacks him under the guise of Sora. However, Naminé's intervention allows Riku to cut through Zexion's illusion and accept the power of darkness. Zexion retreats, only to be killed by Vexen's replica of Riku at the encouragement of Axel, who determines Zexion to be an obstacle for his and Saïx's own agenda. Zexion's death leads to the revival of an adult Ienzo in Dream Drop Distance. In Kingdom Hearts III, Ienzo acts as an ally to Sora in his mission to restore Roxas, which he achieved once reunited with Ansem the Wise. Ienzo, Even, and Ansem would later resurrect Naminé via the Replica Program.

Saïx

He was originally a resident of Radiant Garden named  and Lea's best friend who met Ventus during the events of Birth By Sleep. During a successful attempt to sneak into the castle, they found and befriended an imprisoned girl designated "Subject X", who was being used for Ansem the Wise's experiments. Isa and Lea periodically visited Subject X before attempting to rescue her one-day but she had disappeared. Isa joined Lea in an endeavor to become apprentices to Ansem the Wise to find out what happened to Subject X, which led to Isa becoming Saïx. Saïx had Axel help him climb the Organization's ranks to become Xemnas' second-in-command in the hopes of finding clues to Subject X's whereabouts. However, his cold and ruthless personality as a Nobody and obsession of restoring himself as a complete being strained his friendship with Axel; furthermore, Saïx grew jealous of Axel's friendship with Roxas and Xion, and saw it as an act of betrayal against him and Subject X as he came to believe Axel had abandoned them.

In 358/2 Days, Saïx assigns missions to other Organization members and is tasked by Xemnas to oversee the progress of Xion, whom Saïx disregards as a failed experiment. He also conspires with Axel to gain leverage over Xemnas by assassinating the members stationed at Castle Oblivion until Axel develops a friendship with Roxas and Xion, which causes Saïx to feel betrayed. Towards the end of the game, Saïx attacks Roxas for attempting to leave the Organization, only to lose to the younger Nobody. Saïx encounters Sora at various points in Kingdom Hearts II to goad him into destroying more Heartless, eventually explaining Sora's purpose in the Organization's plans to him. He also reveals Kairi to be the Organization's hostage in order to further motivate Sora. At the World That Never Was, Saïx attempts to stop Kairi from escaping with Naminé but he is forced to retreat by Riku. Later, Saïx draws power from the lunar form of Kingdom Hearts to fight Sora but he is defeated and fades into darkness. Saïx's death results in his return to human form in Radiant Garden but he's taken by Braig and Young Xehanort not long after. In Dream Drop Distance, he appears as one of Xehanort's thirteen "seekers of darkness" necessary for the creation of the χ-blade. In Kingdom Hearts III, Saïx talks to Vexen in the Keyblade Graveyard, asking why the latter chose to give up his restored humanity and become a Nobody again. He later meets with Lea on Twilight Town's clock tower the day before the battle and they discuss Subject X. In the Keyblade Graveyard, Saïx battles Sora's group and makes amends with Lea by confessing his feelings of jealousy and abandonment before peacefully fading away in Lea's arms. He is later restored as Isa again and joins Lea, Roxas, and Xion in Twilight Town before going to Destiny Islands with them to celebrate their victory against Xehanort. At one point, it's confirmed by Marluxia that Saïx is the one who invited Vexen back into the Organization, which is also confirmed in Secret Report 7. In his scene with Demyx, Vexen implies that he's acting on Saïx's behalf in a shared goal for atonement and that Roxas' revival was Saïx's idea. This was also confirmed in the Kingdom Hearts III Ultimania, which revealed that Saïx rejoined the Organization to make amends for the misery he had caused Axel, Roxas, and Xion.

Axel

, originally a Radiant Garden citizen named , is the Organization's resident assassin who is entrusted with killing the group's traitors and was the original Organization's number eight. He is also the best friend and mentor of Roxas, whose relationship with him enables Axel to re-experience human emotion as a Nobody. He frequently utters the phrase, "Got it memorized?", which he does to achieve his own ideal of immortality through other people's memories. Years before becoming Axel, Lea was Isa's childhood friend and he befriended Ventus, whose appearance Roxas emulated due to their connection to Sora, during the events of Birth By Sleep. When he and Isa snuck into the castle, they found a secret area underneath and befriended a girl being held there called "Subject X", who was being used for Ansem the Wise's experiments. As Lea and Isa continued to visit Subject X, Lea was determined to save her but one day she had disappeared. Lea and Isa attempted to find her by becoming apprentices to Ansem the Wise but this led to Lea's transition to Axel as he and Saïx, Isa's Nobody, were inducted into the Organization but remained true to their intentions of finding Subject X and regaining their humanity.

Axel is one of the members that Sora encounters at Castle Oblivion in Chain of Memories, where he acts as a double agent within Marluxia and Larxene's attempted coup against the Organization. The events of 358/2 Days reveal his actions at Castle Oblivion to be part of own conspiracy with Saïx to gain leverage over the Organization, which Axel eventually abandons in favor of pursuing his friendship with Roxas and Xion over the course of the game. Upon learning of Xion's true nature as a replica created by the Organization to absorb Roxas, Axel reluctantly allows her to escape, which results in Roxas's defection from the group. In Kingdom Hearts II, he is ordered to retrieve and later kill Roxas, but Roxas defeats him and merges with Sora, although the two friends reconcile. Axel later kidnaps Kairi in an effort to lure Sora, intending to turn him into a Heartless and reunite with Roxas. After Saïx takes Kairi on the Organization's behalf, Axel performs a suicide attack against a swarm of Nobodies to save Sora, apologizing for his actions as he fades away. Axel's sacrifice restores him to his human form as Lea in Dream Drop Distance, although those familiar with his Nobody still address him as Axel, to his grudging acceptance. Lea sets out to find the missing Braig and Isa, helping Riku and Mickey Mouse rescue Sora from Xehanort's Organization XIII. Lea reveals he had acquired a Keyblade, requesting Yen Sid to teach him to use it alongside Kairi. In Kingdom Hearts III, Lea, still determined to bring back Roxas, continues his Keyblade training with Kairi. By the time it's completed, Lea is reunited with the revived Ventus before going to the clock tower in Twilight Town. He is joined by Saïx and the two talk about how their involvement with Subject X led them to where they are now. In the Keyblade Graveyard the following day, Lea, Kairi, and Sora fight Saïx and an unknown hooded Organization member. He is heavily injured by Xemnas and almost killed by the hooded girl until Sora stops her and calls her Xion. Xemnas kicks them back, causing the Xion's hood to reveal her face and Lea's memories of her to return. Xemnas almost kills Xion but is stopped by the return of Roxas. After Saïx is defeated by Sora, Roxas, and Xion, Lea makes amends with him before Saïx fades away in his arms. Reunited with Roxas and Xion, Lea helps Sora and the others defeat Master Xehanort and close Kingdom Hearts. After Xehanort's demise, Lea, Roxas, Xion, and the revived Isa sit together on the clock tower before joining the others on Destiny Islands.

Nomura designed Lea/Axel based on a similar concept as Reno from Final Fantasy VII; Nomura wanted to see what it would be like to have a similar character in a different role and world. In Birth by Sleep, Nomura included a scene where protagonist Ventus—whose appearance is deliberately identical to Roxas's—encounters Axel's human counterpart, which he hoped would convey the character's importance to newcomers and older players of the franchise.

Demyx

He behaves as an easygoing and self-professed slacker, and has a noted lack of combat skill. His weapon is a sitar that he uses to control water and create duplicates of himself, and he commands the "Dancer" Nobodies. He is encountered in the underworld at the Hercules-inspired world of Olympus Coliseum, where he reluctantly fights Sora to elicit a response from Roxas, who had fused with Sora. He battles Sora's party again at Hollow Bastion after they enrage him by mocking his nature as a Nobody, but he is defeated and fades into darkness. He also appears in 358/2 Days, where he frequently tricks Roxas into doing his work on missions, only participating out of fear of being transformed into a Dusk. Demyx appears in Kingdom Hearts III as one of the real Organization's members but is "benched" as a member, kept as a reserve vessel for Xehanort's heart. He later conspires with Vexen to aid in the resurrection of Roxas via the Replica Program.

Luxord

 is a courteous gambler nicknamed the  who speaks in rhetoric and gaming-related metaphors, being the Nobody of an ancient Keyblade wielder that Xehanort picked. He controls the "Gambler" Nobodies, and he uses a deck of playing cards as his weapons. He also has power over time, and can transform Sora into a card or gaming die. He appears before Sora's party in Kingdom Hearts II when he invades the world known as The Caribbean, using the cursed Aztec gold to produce a powerful Heartless. He later faces Sora in a timed, game-like battle at the World That Never Was and, upon being defeated, accusingly calls out to Roxas within Sora while fading away. Luxord also appears in 358/2 Days, where he accompanies Roxas on various missions to Wonderland, based on the 1951 film Alice in Wonderland. He appeared in Kingdom Hearts III as a member of Xehanort's Organization, offering his services to Davy Jones during his second invasion of the Caribbean, before his eventual defeat while giving Sora a "wild card" that might help him later. A man also voiced by Nakata and Downes (in Japanese and English, respectively) with a similar appearance to Luxord also appears as the driver of Yozora's limousine in the true ending of the game's Secret Episode. It is currently unknown if the man is Luxord, his Somebody, or someone entiretly different.

Marluxia
 
Despite being one of the Organization's newer members, he is given lordship of Castle Oblivion in recognition of his profound abilities where he serves as the main antagonist of Kingdom Hearts: Chain of Memories.

Plotting to use Sora and Naminé to overthrow the Organization, Marluxia lures the former to Castle Oblivion and gives him a set of cards to progress, allowing Naminé to manipulate Sora's memories and enslave him. He collaborates with fellow members Larxene and Axel, assigning the latter with eliminating Vexen to prevent him from revealing Marluxia's plan to Sora. However, Axel ultimately betrays them by releasing Naminé. Following Larxene's death, Marluxia kidnaps Naminé and orders her to erase Sora's memories so he can rebuild Sora into his pawn, but she refuses. Marluxia battles Sora using an illusion of himself, and later while fused to a massive Nobody, but is defeated and dissolves into darkness. Marluxia makes a minor appearance in 358/2 Days, where he expresses his interest in Roxas's Keyblade while training him, and considers including Roxas in his and Larxene's alliance shortly before being sent to Castle Oblivion. Marluxia returns in Kingdom Hearts III as one of Xehanort's vessels, reintroducing himself to Sora as a member of the Organization due to the youth having no memory of him while targeting Rapunzel. After being defeated by Sora in the Keyblade Graveyard, Marluxia begins regaining his emotions and memories and thanks Sora before fading away.

Larxene

Larxene first appeared in Chain of Memories as Marluxia's co-conspirator for control of the Organization, helping to manipulate Sora's memories by causing him to remember Naminé's name. After Larxene discovers Axel's betrayal and sees that Marluxia's plans have fallen apart, she decides to reveal her and Marluxia's plans to Sora with the intention of killing him. However, Donald and Goofy arrive to assist Sora, and the three defeat Larxene, who fades into darkness. She makes a minor appearance in 358/2 Days as a tutor of Roxas, whom she refuses to include in her and Marluxia's alliance due to frustration with his lack of experience. Larxene returns in Kingdom Hearts III, serving as one of Xehanort's vessels while targeting Elsa until confirming that both Elsa and Anna are among the New Seven Hearts. With Luxord and Marluxia, Larxene is defeated by Sora and claims to have only gotten involved with the Organization because she was "just along for the ride" with someone but doesn't reveal who.

Roxas

Born during the events of the first game when Sora becomes a Heartless to restore Kairi's heart, Roxas possesses the ability to wield a Keyblade, for which he is inducted within the Organization to further their goal of collecting hearts, until he decides to abandon the Organization to discover his origins. He is the main player-controlled character of Kingdom Hearts II's prologue sequence, and serves as the main protagonist of Kingdom Hearts 358/2 Days, which further explores his membership in the Organization up until the events of Kingdom Hearts II.

Xion

 is the de facto fourteenth member of Organization XIII, introduced in 358/2 Days. First appearing as a featureless, hooded figure, she comes to form her own identity during her time spent working alongside Roxas, bonding over their similarities such as a lack of memories of their past lives and an ability to wield a Keyblade. She eventually comes to forge a strong friendship with Roxas and Axel. After Riku makes her question her own existence, Xion discovers that she is a Replica—an artificial human—designed to absorb Sora's scattered memories following the events of Chain of Memories and duplicate Roxas's powers as a fail-safe for the Organization's plan, and is not counted as an official member of the Organization. Her physical appearance differs among those who see her, with her most prominent form resembling Kairi, who embodies Sora's most precious memories. Because her existence prevents Sora from awakening, Xion is initially torn between staying with her friends and merging with Sora, but she chooses to sacrifice herself when she begins draining Roxas's power. However, she is recaptured and forced to fight Roxas in order to absorb him and become a perfect copy of Sora. After Roxas defeats her, she asks him to release the stolen hearts from Kingdom Hearts before she returns to Sora, erasing all memory of her from those she has encountered. She makes minor appearances in Birth by Sleep, Coded, and Dream Drop Distance, showing her to still exist within Sora's heart.

In Kingdom Hearts III, Xion is revived by Vexen through his Replica Program as the final member of the real Organization XIII. Lea slowly begins to recall his friendship with Xion, through his interactions with Kairi. Xion participates in the second Keyblade War against the Guardians of Light. Though at first complicent in aiding Xemnas, Xion finds herself unable to harm Lea. She sides with Sora upon Roxas' revival, reuniting with her friends. Following Xehanort's defeat, Xion befriends Hayner, Pence, Olette, and Isa, and is present on Destiny Islands when Sora fades from existence.

Xion was conceptualized during development of Kingdom Hearts II in which the staff wanted to explain the reason why Roxas left Organization XIII. Additionally, the staff wanted to create a new member from the cartel, but having a different nature from all the other members. Xion's name was coined by Tomoko Kanemaki, one of the scenario writers for 358/2 Days and the author of the Kingdom Hearts novel series. It is also revealed within the game's "Secret Reports" that her name is an anagram of " " and the letter X, the former being an imaginary unit.

Reception
The obscure nature of the Organization's activities throughout Kingdom Hearts: Chain of Memories and Kingdom Hearts II led reviewers to describe them as an "ominous" group that "seems to be intent on guiding Sora and his friends to accomplish some dark purpose". Similarly, Rice Burner of GamePro emphasizes this plot when reviewing the group's debut, noting how the "strange inhabitants of the castle trap our heroes" and "force Sora on a ponderous journey into his own memories to face his subconscious thoughts and fears". This mysterious perception is furthered by the fact that some members of Organization XIII present themselves as dark silhouettes with their faces covered, acting as an "enigmatic robed and cowled figure speaking in riddles". The questions surrounding the groups motivation and purpose have created great curiosity among players; Andrew Reiner of Game Informer included "What secret lies behind Organization XIII?" as one of the main questions that are answered and that serve as plot devices in Kingdom Hearts II, creating situations that "certainly give you shivers and make your heart leap". Visually, the artwork of Organization XIII's members is based more on the styles of Final Fantasy rather than those of Disney. Bethany Massimilla of GameSpot referred to their models as "very much cut from the Final Fantasy spiky-haired cloth".

Individually, the members of Organization XIII have received varied receptions. Jeff Haynes of IGN felt that Roxas was a "likable kid", and Rob Fahey of Eurogamer concurred, calling him a "likeable enough young chap who just happens to be troubled by memories and visions of people he doesn't even know". His playable involvement in the game was regarded as a transitional arc, being used to introduce the gameplay to players that are new to the franchise. Fahey also considered it a good introduction, as it lets the player become familiar with the basic elements in a manner that "isn't a bad way at all of setting the scene for the game". However, Reiner emphasizes his role as a "troubled boy", calling his story arc "an amazing chain of events", particularly noting that the revelation of his nature as a Nobody creates a "devilish yet remarkable plot twist" which may impact the player in a way that he "may not want Sora back". The introduction of Xion in trailers for Kingdom Hearts 358/2 Days, created expectation, particularly based on the facts that her face could not be distinguished and that she wields a keyblade. In the 2009 Nintendo Power Awards, the magazine's readers voted Xion the "Best New Character" of the year. GameSpot's Kevin VanOrd noted in a preview of Kingdom Hearts 358/2 Days, that Xigbar's ranged magic proved helpful while fighting as an ally along Roxas.

Notes

References

Fictional secret societies
Kingdom Hearts original characters
Lists of fictional characters by organization
Video game bosses